The Central Sudetes ( or Střední Sudety) are the central part of the Sudetes mountain range on the border of the Czech Republic and Poland. They stretch from the Nysa Kłodzka River and the Kłodzko Valley in the east to the upper Bóbr in the west.

The Central Sudetes comprise a number of mountain ranges, including:
 Orlické Mountains
 Bystrzyckie Mountains
 Bardzkie Mountains
 Owl Mountains
 Stone Mountains
 Stołowe Mountains
The largest town within the Central Sudetes is Wałbrzych in Poland, where the Owl Mountains contain extended black coal reserves.

Literary Heights Festival 

The Literary Heights Festival, a Polish literary festival founded in 2015 which takes place in the vicinity of Nowa Ruda at the foot of the Owl Mountains in the Kłodzko Valley.

The event's organizers include the Mount Babel Cultural Association, the city and commune of Nowa Ruda, while the hosts are Karol Maliszewski and Olga Tokarczuk, who lives in Krajanów. The festival's program includes educational sessions, debates, concerts, panels, shows, meetings, poetry, literary workshops, film screenings, culinary workshops and various exhibitions.

See also
 Western Sudetes
 Eastern Sudetes

Bibliography
 M. Staffa (1982): Przewodnik turystyczny: Wędrówka przez Sudety Środkowe: Góry Wałbrzyskie – Góry Suche – Góry Sowie – Góry Bardzkie. Wyd. PTTK "Kraj": Warszawa/Krakow 
 K. Radwański, M. Szymczak (2008): Atlas gór Polski: Sudety. Karpaty. Góry Świętokrzyskie. Wyda. ExpressMap: Warszawa 
 Praca zbiorowa: Mapa Sudety Środkowe (scale 1:40 000). Wydawnictwo Turystyczne Plan: Jelenia Góra 
 M. Mota (1998): Sudety Środkowe, Wschodnie i Kotlina Kłodzka (A. Rajwa Geologia i rzeźba; C. Skała Geografia i przyroda); Wyd."Pascal": Bielsko-Biała 

Sudetes
Mountain ranges of Poland
Mountain ranges of the Czech Republic